Rassau, sometimes The Rassau), is a village and community located in the historic county of Brecknockshire (Breconshire) and the preserved county of Gwent. It currently lies on the northern edge of the county borough of Blaenau Gwent in Wales. According to the 2011 census, the population of Rassau is 3,234. Residents often refer to either Old Rassau and New Rassau or Bottom Rassau and Top Rassau to distinguish the different parts of the village.

History
The Rassau area was historically part of the parish of Llangynidr in Brecknockshire. In 1878 Rassau was added to the Ebbw Vale Urban Sanitary District. When elected county councils were established in 1889, urban sanitary districts which straddled county boundaries, as Ebbw Vale did, were placed entirely in the administrative county which had the majority of the district's population. Rassau and neighbouring Beaufort were therefore transferred from Brecknockshire to the administrative county of Monmouthshire on 1 April 1889. Ebbw Vale Urban Sanitary District became Ebbw Vale Urban District in 1894. Further local government reform in 1974 saw Ebbw Vale Urban District abolished, becoming the Ebbw Vale community of the Blaenau Gwent district of Gwent. A Beaufort community was created in 1985 from part of the Ebbw Vale community, covering both Beaufort and Rassau. This was further divided in 2010 to create a community of Rassau.

Welsh language

According to the 1991 census, only 107 residents, or 2.7% of the population aged three and over, could speak Welsh. However, in the 2001 census, 281 residents, or 8.8% of the population aged three and over, were recorded as able to speak Welsh. It is likely that Welsh was still the everyday language of a number of residents throughout the early 1900s because in 1909, Theophilus Jones described the neighbouring village of Beaufort as bilingual, the language preference being English. This is supported by the Reverend Peter Williams' monograph, 'The Story of Carmel', published in 1965. He reports that between 1904 and 1906, the change was made to conduct the evening Sunday service in English, whereas previously both the morning and evening services had been in Welsh.

Customs
At one time the Mari Lwyd was widespread all over Gwent – especially in the Welsh-speaking areas of the north and west, but as the Welsh language lost ground so too did the Mari Lwyd. Its last recorded appearance in the borough was in The Rassau during the 1880s.

Circuit of Wales

An  site northwest of the village and beyond Rassau Industrial Estate is the proposed site of the Circuit of Wales, a  motor racing circuit which is currently subject to planning permission. The proposed £250m development is claimed by backers to represent the most significant capital investment programme in automotive and motor sports infrastructure in the UK in 50 years. The development would also include: a karting track; a 4x4 circuit; a Motocross track; a racing academy including driver education; a low carbon technology park; an extension to the existing industrial estate; a retail park; a hotel and leisure facilities. The backers have proposed in their plans that up to 12,000 jobs could be created across the development, in an area which currently has one of the UK's highest unemployment rates. Located directly adjacent to the border of Brecon Beacons National Park, the development is opposed by organisations including the Gwent Wildlife Trust and the Open Spaces Society. If given planning permission, construction would be undertaken by FCC Construcción of Spain, and be built to Fédération Internationale de l'Automobile and Federation Internationale de Motocyclisme standards.

See also
 Rassa Railroad

References

Villages in Blaenau Gwent
Communities in Blaenau Gwent